The Point of Rocks Historic Transportation Corridor in Mineral County, Montana is a historic district including portions of the historic Mullan Road and the Milwaukee Road Railroad.

The district was listed on the U.S. National Register of Historic Places on September 4, 2009. The listing was announced as the featured listing in the National Park Service's weekly list of September 11, 2009.

It is located two miles west of Alberton, Montana.

References

External links

Historic districts on the National Register of Historic Places in Montana
Chicago, Milwaukee, St. Paul and Pacific Railroad
Rail transportation on the National Register of Historic Places in Montana
Road transportation on the National Register of Historic Places
Historic trails and roads in Montana
National Register of Historic Places in Mineral County, Montana
Transportation in Mineral County, Montana